Constantin Gheorghiu (born 1 June 1933) is a Romanian boxer. He competed in the men's featherweight event at the 1960 Summer Olympics.

References

1933 births
Living people
Romanian male boxers
Olympic boxers of Romania
Boxers at the 1960 Summer Olympics
Sportspeople from Bucharest
Featherweight boxers